Philip Phile (German: Pfeil) ( 1734–1793) was a German-American composer and violinist. His year of birth is uncertain, but believed to be approximately 1734. His works include a lost Violin Concerto (1787), but he is best known for "The President's March", written and performed at the inauguration of President George Washington.

Joseph Hopkinson arranged the piece with lyrics and titled it "Hail Columbia". It was first performed by at the Chestnut Street Theatre on April 25, 1798. It is best known under this title and was once a strong candidate for U.S. national anthem, though today it has, unlike other candidates, such as "America the Beautiful", been largely forgotten, although it continues to appear in films set in the United States during the nineteenth century.

References

External links
 
 

1734 births
1793 deaths
18th-century American composers
18th-century male musicians
American composers
American male composers
American people of German descent
National anthem writers